Lagan (Lagaň) is a town and the administrative center of Lagansky District in the Republic of Kalmykia, Russia, located a few kilometers from the Caspian Sea. Population:  In terms of population, it is the second biggest town in the republic after the capital Elista.

History
It was founded in 1870. Town status was granted to it in 1963. In Soviet period, from 1944 to 1991, it was known as Kaspiysky() In 1964 Lagan has been granted city status.  Lagan was held by Germans during August-December 1942, infiltrated by The Abwehr, 1933-November 1943, etc.

Administrative and municipal status
Within the framework of administrative divisions, Lagan serves as the administrative center of Lagansky District. As an administrative division, it is incorporated within Lagansky District as the Town of Lagan. As a municipal division, the Town of Lagan is incorporated within Lagansky Municipal District as Laganskoye Urban Settlement.

Religion
Most of the population in Lagan are Buddhists. There is a Buddhist temple in the town, known as Dardeling Temple.

References

Notes

Sources

Cities and towns in Kalmykia
Populated places in Lagansky District